I29 may refer to:
 Interstate 29